The JPX D-320 and D330 are a family of French twin-cylinder, horizontally opposed, two-stroke aircraft engines.

The engine was introduced specifically for the powered paraglider market, as part of the company's comeback efforts following going out of business in the early 1990s. Production of the engine had ended by 2012.

Design and development
The engine has two cylinders in a horizontally opposed configuration, with cooling fins on the cylinders. The single ignition system uses capacitor discharge ignition. Fuel is metered by a single Tillotson carburetor. Starting is only by electric start, without recoil start as an option.

The D-320 has a redline rpm of 6600 and uses a belt reduction drive of 2.38:1. Its weight of just  gives the engine a high power-to-weight ratio.

Variants
D-320
Twin-cylinder, horizontally opposed aircraft engine introduced in the mid-1990s and currently out of production.
D330
Twin-cylinder, horizontally opposed aircraft engine, improved variant, currently in production.

Applications
Alpaero Exel
Alpaero Sirius
Bailey JPX D330
D'Yves Yvasion 2000
Ekolot JK 01A Elf
Reflex J 320
Technic'air Fly Roller

Specifications (D330)

See also

References

Air-cooled aircraft piston engines
Two-stroke aircraft piston engines